Drew Basil (born November 17, 1991) is a gridiron football placekicker who is currently a free agent. He has been a member of the Atlanta Falcons, Montreal Alouettes and Cleveland Gladiators.

College career
Basil committed to Ohio State University and played four years for the Ohio State Buckeyes football team. He graduated in 2013 ranked eighth all-time in field goals made at Ohio State, with 33; and third all time in field goal percentage, with 78.6%.

Professional career
Basil went undrafted in the 2014 NFL Draft, later signing with the Atlanta Falcons as an undrafted free agent. He later spent time with the Montreal Alouettes of the Canadian Football League in 2015, but failed to make the final roster. On March 30, 2017, Basil signed with the Cleveland Gladiators of the Arena Football League for the 2017 Arena Football League season.

After Sports 
He now coaches high school football and golf at the Upper Arlington High School and has coached over 20 division 1 athletes. Most notably he has produced athletes such as Zac Yoakam (Kicker at Notre Dame), Cameron Shirkey (Kicker at Notre Dame College) and Tyler Perkins (Punter at Iowa State).

References

External links
 
arenafan.com profile
Ohio State Buckeyes bio

1991 births
Living people
People from Chillicothe, Ohio
Players of American football from Ohio
American football placekickers
Canadian football placekickers
American players of Canadian football
Ohio State Buckeyes football players
Atlanta Falcons players
Montreal Alouettes players
Cleveland Gladiators players